The Nativity Church, also known as the Cathedral of the Birth of Christ, is the largest and newest church in Tiraspol, the capital of Transnistria. It is a Russian Orthodox Church completed in 1999 to serve as the Mother Church of the Orthodox Christian Diocese of Tiraspol. 

Celebrations marking the completion of the cathedral included, among other things, the issuing of a series of postage stamps featuring the church (see Transnistrian stamps issued for Christmas 1999). In 2001, the cathedral's image was displayed on the principal coins struck for a commemorative series of gold and silver currency featuring Orthodox Temples of Transnistria.

External links 
 Orthodox Wiki Diocese of Tiraspol-Dubossary

Cathedrals in Transnistria
Churches completed in 1999
20th-century Eastern Orthodox church buildings
Tiraspol
Tiraspol
Buildings and structures in Tiraspol
1999 establishments in Moldova